Zolini is a tribe of ground beetles in the family Carabidae. There are 11 genera and more than 60 described species in Zolini. All but one of the genera are found in Australia and New Zealand. The genus Merizodus occurs in South America.

Genera
These 11 genera belong to the tribe Zolini:
 Idacarabus Lea, 1910 - Australia
 Maungazolus Larochelle & Larivière, 2017 - New Zealand
 Merizodus Solier, 1849 - South America
 Oopterus Guérin-Méneville, 1841 - New Zealand
 Percodermus Sloane, 1920 - Australia
 Pseudoopterus Csiki, 1928 - New Zealand
 Pterocyrtus Sloane, 1920 - Australia
 Sloaneana Csiki, 1933 - Australia
 Synteratus Broun, 1909 - New Zealand
 Thayerella Baehr, 2016 - Australia
 Zolus Sharp, 1886 - New Zealand

References

Trechinae
Beetle tribes